Memdidi is a 1961 Hindi film produced by L. B. Lachman and directed by Hrishikesh Mukherjee. The film stars David, Jayant, Lalita Pawar, Asit Sen and Tanuja. The film's music is by Salil Choudhury. Hrishikesh Mukherjee also directed its remake Achha Bura in 1983, replacing Jayant with Jayant's son Amjad Khan.

Cast 
 David
 Jayant
 Lalita Pawar
 Asit Sen
 Tanuja

Music
"Main Jaanti Hoon" - Lata Mangeshkar, Mukesh
"Raato Ko Jab Neend Udd Aaye" - Lata Mangeshkar
"Beta Wah Wah Waw Mere Kaan Mat Khaao" - Lata Mangeshkar
"Bhula De Zindagi Ke Gham" - Lata Mangeshkar
"Bachpan O Bachpan Pyare Bachpan" - Lata Mangeshkar
"Ham To Ghar Me Chulha Phuke" - Lata Mangeshkar, Mahendra Kapoor

References

External links
 
 Mem Didi at Bollywood Hungama
 Mem Didi

1961 films
1960s Hindi-language films
Films directed by Hrishikesh Mukherjee
Films scored by Salil Chowdhury